The Defense Centers of Excellence for Psychological Health and Traumatic Brain Injury (DCoE) is a United States Department of Defense (DoD) organization that provides guidance across DoD programs related to psychological health (PH) and traumatic brain injury (TBI) issues. The organization's official mission is to "improve the lives of our nation’s service members, families and veterans by advancing excellence in psychological health and traumatic brain injury prevention and care."

History
Eight different blue ribbon panels and commissions were established in 2007 to examine PTSD, TBI and other combat-related health issues. Policy makers, federal agency representatives, war veterans, academics, health care experts and medical scientists from a number of disciplines convened to address the care of warriors and their families. DCoE was created in response to several of 300-plus key recommendations that were generated, as well as recommendations from the 2008 National Defense Authorization Act. Deputy Secretary of Defense, Gordon England, announced the opening of DCoE in November 2007.

Overview
DCoE focuses on education and training; clinical care; prevention; research; and service member, family and community outreach. In collaboration with the Department of Veterans Affairs, the organization supports the Department of Defense’s commitment of caring for service members from the time they enter service and throughout the completion of their service. DCoE also seeks to mitigate the stigma that still deters some from reaching out for help for problems such as post-traumatic stress disorder and TBI.

The organization has a leadership role in collaborating with a national network of external entities including non-profit organizations, other DoD agencies, academia, Congress, military services and other federal agencies.  Public health service and civil service workers, including personnel from the Department of Veterans Affairs and individuals from all the military services, as well as contract personnel comprise the staff of DCoE.

DCoE offers a variety of services to benefit service members, families and veterans. The organization maintains a 24/7 outreach center staffed by health resource consultants who provide psychological health and TBI information, resources and referrals for service members, veterans and their families. According to an official summary of the organization, "the outreach center also supports the Real Warriors Campaign, an initiative launched by DCoE to promote the processes of building resilience, facilitating recovery and supporting reintegration of returning service members, veterans and their families. The campaign promotes help-seeking behavior among service members and veterans with invisible wounds and encourages the awareness and use of available resources."

DCoE is composed of three centers: Defense and Veterans Brain Injury Center (DVBIC), Deployment Health Clinical Center (DHCC), and the National Center for Telehealth & Technology (T2).

References

External links

 
 Tragic Heroes, from The Atlantic
 Pentagon hopes stories help troops with PTSD, from Stars and Stripes
 New DoD center offers help for PTSD, from Army Times
 Summit addresses military suicides, from San Antonio Express-News
 Report sees long-term problems for troops who suffer traumatic brain injuries, from Los Angeles Times
 Military marches toward mental health, from Washington Times
 In Ancient Dramas, Vital Words for Today’s Warriors, from NPR
 New Army General Leads PTSD, TBI Initiatives, from Psychiatric News
 Real Warriors
 General Sutton/“This Emotional Life”
 [DCoE Annual Report (2008 - 2009)]
 Defense and Veterans Brain Injury Center (DVBIC)
 [March 2018 update bulletin|https://health.mil/News/Articles/2018/03/27/Identification-of-brain-injuries-in-deployed-environment-surged-following-enactment-of-DoD-policies]

Defense Centers of Excellence for Psychological Health and Traumatic Brain Injury
Medical and health organizations based in Virginia